Myagrus vinosus is a species of beetle in the family Cerambycidae. It was described by Francis Polkinghorne Pascoe in 1866, originally under the genus Pharsalia. It is known from Borneo, the Philippines, Malaysia and Sumatra. It feeds on Ficus elastica.

References

Lamiini
Beetles described in 1866